Cambridge is a city in Middlesex County in eastern Massachusetts, United States. Located on the northern shore of the Charles River, it is also a major suburb of Boston, the state capitol and regional financial center. It has a population of 105,000 (2010) and a growing number of high-rise buildings.

Tallest buildings and structures
This list ranks Cambridge buildings that stand at least 200 feet (61 m) tall, based on height measurement criteria established by the Council on Tall Buildings and Urban Habitat (CTBUH) and Emporis.com. This includes spires and architectural details but does not include antenna masts, roof top signs, flag poles or other functional-technical equipment. An equals sign (=) following a rank indicates the same height between two or more buildings. The "Year" column indicates the year in which a building was completed. Freestanding towers, guyed masts and other not habitable structures are included for comparison purposes; however, they are not ranked.

Under construction

Tallest approved or proposed
In 2015, Leland Cheung of the Cambridge City Council contemplated the maximum rezoning of the area in terms of building heights, and asked if buildings of up to  could be considered in the future. A height of 1,000 feet would be over 200 feet taller than the tallest building in the metro-Boston area: the John Hancock Tower.

See also 
 List of tallest buildings in Boston
 List of tallest buildings in Springfield, Massachusetts
 List of tallest buildings in Worcester, Massachusetts
 List of tallest buildings in Massachusetts, exclusive of Boston

References

External links 
 The Skyscraper Center - Cambridge
 The Skyscraper Center - CTBUH Height Criteria
 Emporis.com - Cambridge
 Emporis.com - height (ESN 15705 )
 Structurae.net - Cambridge
 Skyscraper Source Media - Cambridge
 Cambridge.gov - Planning Board

Cambridge
Cambridge, Massachusetts
Cambridge, Massachusetts